Richard William Benet Salway is a senior lecturer in ancient history at University College London. His areas of speciality include Greek and Roman epigraphy and onomastics, Roman law, Roman Imperial history and travel and geography in the Graeco-Roman world.

Biography

Salway attended The Queen's College, Oxford, where he received his DPhil in 1995.

He was part-time tutor in Ancient History at St Anne's College, Oxford and part-time lecturer in Classics at the University of Reading 1993–94 and temporary lecturer in Ancient History at the University of Manchester 1994–95. He was then at University College London as post-doctoral research fellow on the British Academy/Arts and Humanities Research Board-funded Projet Volterra: Law and Empire from 1995 to 1999. He was lecturer in Classics at the University of Nottingham 1999–2001 and moved back to University College London in 2001 as lecturer in Ancient History. In 2007 he was promoted to senior lecturer. In 2005 he became a director of Projet Volterra II: Law and the End of Empire.

Salway has held several other positions at University College London: elected non-professorial representative on the Academic Board 2002–05 and since 2006, elected non-professorial member of the Academic Committee 2004–05, elected non-professorial member of Council since 2006, non-professorial member of the Nominations Committee since 2007, member of the Academic Committee Sub-Committee on Probation since 2008, and non-professorial member of the Governance Committee since 2009.

He was also secretary of the British Epigraphy Society 1999–2004 and a member of the Council of the Society for the Promotion of Roman Studies 2002–05 and has been a member of the Institute of Classical Studies Library Committee since 2001 and Finance Committee since 2008.

Gregorian Code discovery
In 2010 the Volterra database was used by Corcoran and Salway to identify previously unknown fragments of the Gregorian Code. The "Fragmenta Londiniensia" are seventeen pieces of parchment estimated to date from AD400, the document having been cut up and re-used as book-binding material. This is the first original evidence yet discovered of the Gregorian Codex.

Publications

See also
 Michael Crawford

References

External links
 

Alumni of The Queen's College, Oxford
British historians
Historians of antiquity
Living people
People associated with the History Department, University College London
Year of birth missing (living people)